The Cross of All Nations is a monumental cross located in Qanat Bakish, a locality close to the Lebanese town of Baskinta. The cross was built near a church dating back to 1898 on a land belonging to the Lebanese Maronite Order. It was built by the Maronite Church and an organization of French Catholics the "Association Terre de Dieu" led by the brothers Jesus and Francois Ibanez..

Context 
The Feast of the Exaltation of the Cross commemorates the discovery of the Cross of Christ by St. Helen, the mother of Roman emperor Constantine, on September 14, 326. In Lebanon the feast is celebrated each year in Christian towns and cities with crowded processions during which people carry torches and visit mountain tops where they plant crosses, hold prayer services and start bonfires.

Description 
Work on the monument started on 25 November 2008 and was done on 27 June 2010 and cost around 1.5 million USD mainly acquired through donations. The cross is equipped with one ladder that allow visitors to access a  platform located at its vertical beam.

References

External links
 Association Terre de Dieu

Maronite Church in Lebanon
Monuments and memorials in Lebanon
Religious buildings and structures in Lebanon
Monumental crosses
2010 establishments in Lebanon